Richard Posthumus (born July 19, 1950) is an American businessman, and politician. He was the 61st lieutenant governor of Michigan and majority leader of the Michigan Senate. In 2002, he was the unsuccessful Republican nominee for Governor of Michigan.

Posthumus grew up on a dairy farm in Alto, Michigan, outside of Grand Rapids. He graduated from Michigan State University, during which he served as chairman of the College Republicans and as a vice chairman of the Michigan Republican Party.

In 1971, he managed the successful Michigan House of Representatives campaign of fellow student and future Michigan governor John Engler. Posthumus was elected to the Senate in 1982 and became majority leader in 1990, when Engler was elected governor. His 1982 campaign was managed by Saul Anuzis. Posthumus was the longest serving majority leader in the history of the Senate.

Posthumus joined Engler on as his running mate and candidate for lieutenant governor in 1998 and went on to serve in that post for four years. He was the Republican nominee for governor in 2002, having defeated Joe Schwarz in the Republican primary, but lost to Democrat Jennifer Granholm in the general election. He joined Compatico in 2005 and became the chief executive officer in 2006.

On November 8, 2010, Governor-elect Rick Snyder named Posthumus to be his senior adviser and legislative lobbyist.

Personal life
Posthumus married Pam Bartz in 1972. They had four children together, and seven grandchildren. Pam died of cancer on August 18, 2010. Posthumus married Beth Ann (Mihlethaler) Fogg on September 24, 2011. Dick's son, Bryan, is a Michigan state representative, and advocate for Alcoholic's Anonymous.

Electoral history
 2002 election for Governor
 Jennifer Granholm (D), 51%
 Dick Posthumus (R), 47%
 2002 election for Governor – Republican Primary
 Dick Posthumus (R), 81%
 Joe Schwarz (R), 19%

References

|-

1950 births
20th-century American politicians
21st-century American politicians
American people of Dutch descent
College Republicans
Lieutenant Governors of Michigan
Living people
Michigan Republicans
Michigan state senators
Michigan State University alumni
People from Kent County, Michigan